The Archdiocese of Florence is a metropolitan see of the Catholic Church in Italy. It was traditionally founded in the 1st century, according to the 14th century chronicler Giovanni Villani. The diocese was directly subordinate to the Holy See (Papacy) until 1420.

Florence was elevated to the dignity of an archdiocese on May 10, 1419, by Pope Martin V. The ecclesiastical province of Florence, of which the Archbishop of Florence in the metropolitan, includes the suffragan dioceses of Arezzo-Cortona-Sansepolcro, Fiesole, Pistoia, Prato, and San Miniato.

Since September 2008 Cardinal Giuseppe Betori has been the Archbishop.

History

On 29 July 1322, Pope John XXII reserved to the pope the right to nominate as well as confirm the bishops of Florence.

Due to heavy rains in the autumn and winter of 1346–1347, the crops were a failure, in wheat as well as in grapes and olives. By May 1347 the price of wheat in Florence had doubled. Arrangements were made to import grain from south Italy, Sicily and Africa, but the merchants of Siena and Genoa, who were contracted to transport the foodstuffs, kept half for their own cities. 94,000 inhabitants of Florence were dependent upon municipal charity, and some 4,000 were said to have died of starvation.

Then, in April 1348, the pestilence known as the Black Death, struck Florence. By July nearly 100,000 people were dead. The historian Giovanni Villani estimated that nearly three out of every five persons in Florence and its neighborhood had been struck down. Ultimately he himself succumbed. In his famous introduction to the Decameron, Giovanni Boccaccio repeats the number 100,000 and provides harrowing details of the breakdown of social connections and human feelings.

Other episodes of pestilence in Florence occurred in 1325, 1340, 1344, 1363, 1509, 1522–1528, and 1630.

Council of Florence
In 1438, the Council of Basel was moved to Ferrara, and, in doing so, split into two factions, one remaining at Basel and electing their own pope, the Antipope Felix V. The faction that settled at Ferrara had to leave soon, however, due to an appearance of the plague. They were reconstituted at Florence by Pope Eugenius IV, and became the Council of Florence, which was transferred to Rome in 1443.

Chapter and cathedral

The current cathedral of Florence is dedicated to the Assumption of the Body of the Virgin Mary into Heaven. The cathedral was originally dedicated to S. John the Baptist, and occupied the former temple of Mars. When it became too small for the clergy and necessary rituals, a new cathedral, dedicated to S. Reparata, was built.

In 816, the Emperor Louis the Pious held a council at Aix, at which it was ordered that Canons and Canonesses live together according to a set of rules (canons, regulae). In the Roman synod of Pope Eugene II of November 826, it was ordered that Canons live together in a cloister next to the church. In 876, the Council of Pavia decreed in Canon X that the bishops should enclose the Canons: uti episcopi in civitatibus suis proximum ecclesiae claustrum instituant, in quo ipsi cum clero secundum canonicam regulam Deo militent, et sacerdotes suos ad hoc constringant, ut ecclesiam non relinquant et alibi habitare praesumant. The cathedral was administered by a Chapter, composed of five dignities and thirty-seven Canons. The dignities were: the Provost, the Archdeacon, the Archpriest, and the Dean.

The diocese also had twelve collegiate churches, the most important of which is San Lorenzo.

Diocesan synods

A diocesan synod was an irregularly held, but important, meeting of the bishop of a diocese and his clergy. Its purpose was (1) to proclaim generally the various decrees already issued by the bishop; (2) to discuss and ratify measures on which the bishop chose to consult with his clergy; (3) to publish statutes and decrees of the diocesan synod, of the provincial synod, and of the Holy See.

1073 - Raynerius.
1139 - Gottifredo degli Alberti.
1310, 13 August - Antonio D'Orso.
1327, 1 August - Francesco di Silvestro.
1343 - Angelo Acciaiuoli seniore.
1346  Angelo Acciaiuoli 
1350, March - Angelo Acciaioli seniore.
1372, 13–14 January -Angelo Ricasoli.
1393, 3 July - Onofrio Visdomini.
1415 - Amerigo Corsini.
1446, 22 April - Antonino Pierozzi.
1508 - Cosimo Pazzi.
1517 - Cardinal Giulio de' Medici
1565, 29 March - Antonio Altoviti.
1569, 5 May - Antonio Altoviti.
1573, 9 April - Antonio Altoviti (provincial synod)
1589, 26 March-11 June - Cardinal Alessandro de' Medici.
1603, 17 June - Cardinal Alessandro de' Medici.
1610, 27 May - Alessandro Marzi Medici.
1614, 4 June - Alessandro Marzi Medici.
1619, 14–15 May - Alessandro Marzi Medici.
1623, 17 May - Alessandro Marzi Medici.
1627, 18 May - Alessandro Marzi Medici.
1629, 10 May - Alessandro Marzi Medici.
1637, 16 June - Pietro Niccolini.
1645, 17 May - Pietro Niccolini.
1656, 4 April - Cardinal Francesco Nerli seniore.
1663, 26 September - Cardinal Francesco Nerli seniore.
1666, 23 September - Cardinal Francesco Nerli seniore.
1669, 25 September - Cardinal Francesco Nerli seniore.
1674, 12 September - Cardinal Francesco Nerli iuniore.
1678, 31 August - Cardinal Francesco Nerli iuniore.
1681, 27 August - Cardinal Francesco Nerli iuniore.
1691, 26 September - Jacopo Antonio Morigia.
1699, 24 September - Jacopo Antonio Morigia
1710, 10 September - Tommaso Bonaventura Della Gherardesca.
1732, 24 September - Giuseppe Maria Martelli.
1905, 21–23 November - Alfonso Maria Mistrangelo.
1936, 10–12 September - Cardinal Elia Dalla Costa.
1946, 8–9 May - Cardinal Elia Dalla Costa.
1988 - Cardinal Silvano Piovanelli.
1992 - Cardinal Silvano Piovanelli.

Bishops of Florence

to 1200

 Felix (attested 313)
...
Zenobius (c.376–417)
...
 Mauritius ( –550)
...
 Reparatus (attested 679, 684)
...
Speciosus (attested 716, 724)
...
Thomas (attested 743)
...
Aliprandus (attested 826, 833)
...
Rodingus (attested 852)
Gerardus (attested 853, 855)
Petrus (attested 861)
Andreas (attested 873, 876, 890)
...
Grasulphus (attested 897, 898, 904)
...
Podo (Podio) (attested 908–926)
...
Raimbaldus (attested 941, 964)
Sichelmus (attested 966, 972)
...
Podio (Podius) (attested 987–999)
Guido (attested 1004–1007)
Ildebrandus (Hildebrand) (attested 1008–1024)
Lambertus (attested 1025, 1028, 1032)
Atto (attested 1036, 1037)
 Gérard de Bourgogne (1045–1058) 
Petrus Mezzabarba (attested 1065–1068)
Sede vacante (1068–1071)
Rodulfus, Bishop of Todi, Apostolic Administrator
Rainerius (attested 1071–1113)
Gotefridus (c.1114–c.1146)
Actius (Atto) (1143–1154)
Ambrosius (1155–1158)
Julius (attested 1158–1182)
Bernardus (1182-1187)
Paganus (1087–1090)
Petrus (1190–1205)

1200 to 1411

Joannes de Velletri (1205–1230)
Ardingus Trotti (1231–1247)
Philippus Fontana (1250–1251)
Joannes de Mangiadori (1251–after 1275)
Jacobus (Castelbuono), O.P. (1286)
Andreas de Mozzi (1286–1295)
Franciscus de Monaldeschi (1295–1302)
Loterius della Tosa (1303–1309)
Antonius Orso (1310–1321)
Franciscus Silvestri (1323–1341)
 Angelo Acciaiuoli, O.P. (26 Jun 1342–1355)
Francesco degli Atti (1355–1356)
Filippo dell'Antella (1357–1363)
 Pietro Corsini (1 Sep 1363 Appointed – 7 Jun 1370)
Angelo Ricasoli (1370–1383)
 Angelo Acciaioli (1383 Appointed – 20 Nov 1385)
Bartolomeo Uliari, O.Min. (1385–1389)
Onofrio Visdomini, O.E.S.A. (1390–1400)
 Alamanno Adimari (1400–1401)
Jacopo Palladini (1401–1410)
 Francesco Zabarella (1410– 17 June 1411)

Metropolitan Archbishops of Florence

1411 to 1700

 Amerigo Corsini (1411–1434)
 Giovanni Vitelleschi (1435– 9 Aug 1437)
 Ludovico Trevisano (Scarampi Mezzarota) (1437–1439)
 Bartolomeo Zabarella (18 Dec 1439 – 21 Dec 1445 Died)
 Antonino Forcilioni, O.P. † (10 Jan 1446 – 2 May 1459 Died)
 Orlando Bonarli (16 Jun 1459 – 1461 Died)
 Giovanni Neroni Diotisalvi (22 Mar 1462 – 1473 Died)
 Pietro Riario, O.F.M. Conv. (20 Jul 1473 – 3 Jan 1474 Died)
 Rinaldo Orsini (28 Jan 1474  –1508)
 Cosimo de' Pazzi (5 Jul 1508 – 8 Apr 1513 Died)
 Giulio de' Medici (9 May 1513 – 1523)
 Niccolò Ridolfi (11 Jan 1524 – 11 Oct 1532 Resigned)
 Andrea Buondelmonti (1532–1542)
 Niccolò Ridolfi, second term (1543–1548)
 Antonio Altoviti (25 May 1548 – 28 Dec 1573 Died)
 Alessandro Ottaviano de' Medici (15 Jan 1574 –1605)
 Alessandro Marzi de' Medici (1605–1630)
 Cosimo de' Bardi (9 Sep 1630 – 18 Apr 1631 Died)
 Pietro Niccolini (7 Jun 1632 – 1 Dec 1651 Died)
 Francesco Nerli (seniore) (16 Dec 1652 – 6 Nov 1670 Died)
 Francesco Nerli (iuniore) (22 Dec 1670 – 31 Dec 1682 Resigned)
 Giacomo Antonio Morigia, B. (15 Feb 1683 – 23 Oct 1699 Resigned)

since 1700
 Leone Strozzi, O.S.B. (21 Jun 1700 – 4 Oct 1703 Died)
 Tommaso Bonaventura della Gherardesca (12 Nov 1703 – 21 Sep 1721 Died)
 Giuseppe Maria Martelli (2 Mar 1722 – 10 Feb 1740 Resigned)
 Francesco Gaetano Incontri (29 May 1741 – 25 Mar 1781 Died)
 Antonio Martini (25 Jun 1781 – 31 Dec 1809 Died)
 Pietro Francesco Morali (15 Mar 1815 – 29 Sep 1826 Died)
 Ferdinando Minucci (28 Jan 1828 – 2 Jul 1856 Died)
 Giovacchino Limberti (3 Aug 1857 – 27 Oct 1874 Died)
 Eugenio Cecconi (21 Dec 1874 – 15 Jun 1888 Died)
 Agostino Bausa, O.P. (11 Feb 1889 – 15 Apr 1899 Died)
 Alfonso Mistrangelo, Sch. P. (19 Jun 1899 – 7 Nov 1930 Died)
 Elia Dalla Costa (19 Dec 1931 – 22 Dec 1961 Died)
 Ermenegildo Florit (9 Mar 1962 Succeeded – 3 Jun 1977 Retired)
 Giovanni Benelli (3 Jun 1977 – 26 Oct 1982 Died)
 Silvano Piovanelli (18 Mar 1983 – 21 Mar 2001 Retired)
 Ennio Antonelli (2001–2008)
 Giuseppe Betori (8 Sep 2008 – Present)

Churches
 

Santa Maria e Santa Brigida al Paradiso

Notes and references

Bibliography

Reference for bishops

 

 (in Latin)

 (in Latin)

Studies

Caponi, Matteo (2009). "Una diocesi in guerra: Firenze (1914-1918)." Studi Storici vol. 50, no. 1, 2009, pp. 231–255. JSTOR, www.jstor.org/stable/25677430.

Faini, Enrico (2013), "I vescovi dimenticati. Memoria e oblio dei vescovi fiorentini e fiesolani dell'età pre-gregoriana," in: Annali di Storia di Firenze VIII (2013), pp. 11–49. 

  
 Lanzoni, Francesco (1927). Le diocesi d'Italia dalle origini al principio del secolo VII (an. 604),  Faenza 1927, pp. 573–584. 

Ristori, G. B. (1896). "Alcune notizie sul palazzo del vescovo Fiorentino" in: 
Schwartz, Gerhard (1907). Die Besetzung der Bistümer Reichsitaliens unter den sächsischen und salischen Kaisern: mit den Listen der Bischöfe, 951-1122. Leipzig: B.G. Teubner. pp. 207–210. (in lang|de)

External links
GCatholic.org
Catholic Hierarchy

Roman Catholic dioceses in Tuscany

Dioceses established in the 1st century
Florence